Heiban may refer to:

 Heiban people, a people of the Nuba Mountains in South Kordofan, Sudan
 Heiban languages, spoken in the Nuba Mountains of Sudan
 A Japanese pitch accent pattern

See also
 Heian (disambiguation)